Peter Marshall (1939-1972) was a British novelist.

Life 
Peter Marshall was born in 1939. At 18 years old he became infected with polio, which left him almost completely paralyzed. He wrote an autobiography (Two Lives) about his life before and after the illness, for which he received the John Llewellyn Rhys Prize in 1963. He wrote two novels, The Raging Moon (1964) and Excluded from the Cemetery (1966). The movie The Raging Moon was based on his novel by the same title. He lived and worked in a home in Surrey. He died at age 33 in 1972.

Bibliography

References

External links 
 Peter Marshall at Goodreads
 
 

1939 births
1972 deaths
20th-century English novelists
People with polio
British autobiographers
John Llewellyn Rhys Prize winners
English male novelists
Place of birth missing
20th-century English male writers